Bharno (also spelled as Bherno) is a village in the Bharno CD block in the Gumla subdivision of the Gumla district in the Indian state of Jharkhand.

Geography

Location                           
Bharno is located at

Area overview 
The map alongside presents a rugged area, consisting partly of flat-topped hills called pat and partly of an undulating plateau, in the south-western portion of Chota Nagpur Plateau. Three major rivers – the Sankh, South Koel and North Karo - along with their numerous tributaries, drain the area. The hilly area has large deposits of Bauxite. 93.7% of the population lives in rural areas.

Note: The map alongside presents some of the notable locations in the district. All places marked in the map are linked in the larger full screen map.

Civic administration 
There is a police station at Bharno.

The headquarters of Bharno CD block are located at Bharno village.

Demographics 
According to the 2011 Census of India, Bharno had a total population of 8,680, of which 4,230 (49%) were males and 4,450 (51%) were females. Population in the age range 0–6 years was 1,261. The total number of literate persons in Bharno was 5,347 (72.07% of the population over 6 years).

(*For language details see Bharno block#Language and religion)

Education
Government High School Bharno is a Hindi-medium coeducational institution established in 1950. It has facilities for teaching from class VIII to class XII. The school has a playground and a library with 2,500 books.

Lalit Oraon Smarak High School Bharno is a Hindi-medium coeducational institution established in 2014. It has facilities for teaching from class I to class X.

Adivasi Public School Bharno is a Hindi-medium coeducational institution established in 2014. It has facilities for teaching from class I to class X.

References 

Villages in Gumla district